Ane Bošeska (born 13 July 1997) is a Macedonian footballer who plays as a defender for 1. liga club ŽFK Tiverija Istatov and the North Macedonia women's national team.

References

1997 births
Living people
Women's association football defenders
Macedonian women's footballers
North Macedonia women's international footballers